Texas Department of Community Affairs v. Burdine, 450 U.S. 248 (1981), is a United States labor law case of the United States Supreme Court.

Facts
Ms Burdine, a female employee, alleged that the defendant's failure to promote her and subsequent decision to terminate her were premised on illegal gender discrimination.

Judgment

Court of Appeals
The Court of Appeals held that the defendant carried the burden of proving by a preponderance of the evidence that he had legitimate reasons for the employment decision, and that others promoted and hired were better qualified than the plaintiff.

Supreme Court
In holding that the circuit court misconstrued the defendant's evidentiary burden, the Supreme Court attempted to set out the proper approach. The Court concluded that the ultimate burden of persuasion remained with the plaintiff throughout the trial. The Court explained that the defendant's burden was merely an intermediate evidentiary burden requiring the defendant to sustain only the burden of production, never the burden of persuasion. The burden of proof, therefore, never actually shifted from the plaintiff to the defendant but remained with the plaintiff. Furthermore, the Court specified that to rebut the plaintiff's prima facie case, the defendant must simply set forth the reasons for the plaintiff's rejection. Specifically, the employer must create a genuine issue as to whether he intended to discriminate.

Significance
In limiting the defendant's burden merely to producing evidence and placing the entire burden of persuasion on the plaintiff, the Court made it more difficult for the plaintiff to succeed with a disparate treatment claim. A defendant could sustain his or her duty to produce evidence simply by articulating a nondiscriminatory justification for the employment decision. Because this burden is so easily met, the plaintiff will almost always be forced to persuade a court that the defendant's reasons are pretexts and not the true reasons for the employment decision. The plaintiff's burden, therefore, is magnified because he will have to proffer convincing evidence analyzing the employer's intent. Consequently, this higher evidentiary burden has created an increased incentive for plaintiffs to allege discrimination under the disparate impact theory where the employer's intent is not at issue.

See also
List of United States Supreme Court cases, volume 450

References

38 Am. U.L. Rev. 919, 929-930

External links

United States Supreme Court cases
United States employment discrimination case law
1981 in United States case law
United States Supreme Court cases of the Burger Court
United States labor case law
United States gender discrimination case law
History of women in Texas